The Davaoeño people or Davaoeños are the permanent residents of the Davao Region of the island of Mindanao in the Philippines regardless of ethnicity or religion. Locals are themselves often referred to as a "tripeople", composed of indigenous peoples, Moros and descendants of twentieth-century settlers from the Visayas and Luzon.

Cebuano is the lingua franca of the Davao Region, used by its inhabitants of diverse ethnic and religious backgrounds to communicate with each other. Native minority speaks the near-extinct Davaoeño language. Davaoeños often also codeswitch between Cebuano and Tagalog, a phenomenon called Bisalog. English is also widely used.

The following is a list of notable people who were either born in, lived in, are current residents of, or are closely associated with the Davao Region.

Notable people

Culture
Alfredo E. Evangelista – archaeologist
Candy Gourlay – Filipino author based in the United Kingdom
Randy Halasan – winner of the 2014 Ramon Magsaysay Award for Emergent Leadership, for nurturing his Matigsalug students and their community to transform their lives in ways that preserve their integrity as indigenous peoples in a modernizing Philippines

Entertainment

Kaye Cal - singer-songwriter who rose to popularity after becoming a grand finalist of the first season of the talent competition Pilipinas Got Talent
Sharmaine Arnaiz – actress
Thor Dulay – singer-songwriter and vocal coach
Jay Durias – composer, singer, songwriter, arranger, and record producer known for collaborations with South Border
Juris Fernandez – singer and songwriter; former lead singer of acoustic group MYMP from 2003 to 2009
 Anthonny Iinuma - former contestant from 2nd Season of Produce 101 Japan and now contestant of Boys Planet from Korea and trainee of Wake One Entertainment.
Erich Gonzales – actress, host and Star Circle Quest Grand Teen Questor 
The HiMiG Gospel Singers – choral group from Davao City
Mimi Miyagi – model and actress
Iwa Moto – actress, model and teen star
Cassandra Ponti – actress, dancer, model, and Pinoy Big Brother Season 1 3rd Big Placer
Ryan Ramos – actor and host
Steven Silva – footballer, actor, reality TV show contestant
KZ Tandingan –  singer who rose to fame after winning the first season of The X Factor Philippines in 2012
Krissel Valdez – singer; the first runner-up of Star Power: Sharon Search For the Next Female Superstar
Maris Racal – actress, singer, PBB All in 1st runner up, member of It's Showtime's GirlTrends
Chokoleit – actor, comedian
Jona Soquite - singer
Tricia Santos - volleyball player, actor, TV host

Politics and government
Franklin Bautista – politician; member of the Liberal Party; elected to two terms as a Member of the House of Representatives of the Philippines, representing the Second District of Davao del Sur
Noel Felongco – politician; lawyer
Marc Douglas Cagas IV – politician; member of the Nacionalista Party; elected in 2007 as a Member of the House of  Representatives of the Philippines, representing the First District of Davao del Sur
Antonio Carpio – incumbent Senior Associate Justice of the Supreme Court of the Philippines
Teodoro Casiño – politician, activist, writer and journalist; was a member of the House of Representatives for Bayan Muna
Rodrigo Duterte – lawyer, politician and mayor of Davao City (1988–1998, 2001–2010, 2013–2016); 16th President of the Philippines (2016–2022)
Sara Duterte – lawyer and politician; current mayor of Davao City (2010–2013, 2016-2022), 15th Vice President of the Philippines (2022–present)
Vincent Garcia – politician; member of the Nationalist People's Coalition; elected to three terms as a Member of the House of Representatives of the Philippines, representing the Second District of Davao City
Antonio Lagdameo, Jr. – politician; husband of actress Dawn Zulueta; a scion of the wealthy family in Mindanao, the Floirendos; public servant
Romeo Montenegro – peace advocate
Sebastian Duterte – politician and traveller
Prospero Nograles – former Speaker of the House of Representatives of the Philippines
Corazon Nuñez-Malanyaon –  governor of the province of Davao Oriental
Allan L. Rellon – Filipino politician and a member of the PDP Laban Party
Isidro Ungab – politician, former banker, former local legislator of the City of Davao
Wanda Corazon Teo, businesswoman, and former secretary of Tourism
Manuel E. Zamora – politician; member of the LAKAS-CMD Party;  elected to three terms as a Member of the House of Representatives of the Philippines, representing the First District of Compostela Valley
Carlos Isagani Zarate – member of the Philippine House of Representatives, representing Bayan Muna Party-list

Sports
Bong Go – senator
Jerwin Ancajas – World Champion Boxer from Panabo, Davao del Norte; competes in the Super-flyweight division
Amani Aguinaldo – footballer who plays as a defender mainly as a centre back for Global F.C. in the United Football League, and Philippines national team
Francis Allera – professional basketball player; currently plays for the Kia Carnival in the Philippine Basketball Association; small forward
Baser Amer – professional basketball player who plays for the Meralco Bolts in the Philippine Basketball Association
Mark Anthony Barriga – boxer from Panabo, Davao del Norte; competes in the light-flyweight division
Donbel Belano – retired professional basketball player in the Philippine Basketball Association; former head coach of the UV Green Lancers
Lee Vann Corteza – professional pool player
Samigue Eman – professional basketball player who currently plays for the Alaska Aces in the Philippine Basketball Association
Erwin Emata – mountain climber
Pong Escobal – professional basketball player who currently plays for the Air21 Express in the Philippine Basketball Association, having played for Meralco Bolts
John Ferriols – professional basketball; plays for the Meralco Bolts in the Philippine Basketball Association
Diosdado Gabi – retired professional boxer
Ernie Gawilan – swimmer; first Filipino Asian Para Games gold medalist.
Marice Magdolot – footballer for the Philippines women's national football team; midfielder
Sheila Mae Perez – diver; Southeast Asian Games gold medalist. 
Randy Petalcorin – professional boxer from the Sandman Gym in General Santos
Nesthy Petecio – boxer
John Pinto (basketball) – basketball player who currently plays for the San Miguel Beermen of the PBA; drafted 19th overall by the Batang Pier in the 2014 PBA draft
RJ Rizada – professional basketball player who currently plays for the Petron Blaze Boosters in the Philippine Basketball Association; twelfth overall pick in the 2006 PBA Draft
Juanito Rubillar – professional boxer; current WBC Continental Americas light flyweight champion
Tricia Santos (volleyball) – volleyball player; TV reality show contestant
Daisuke Sato (footballer) – Japanese-Filipino footballer for CSM Politehnica Iași in Romania's Liga I and for the Philippines national football team
Alfonso Solis – retired professional basketball player in the Philippine Basketball Association
Alvin Teng – retired professional basketball player who spent 14 seasons in the PBA, mostly with the San Miguel Beermen franchise
Scottie Thompson (basketball) – professional basketball player who currently plays for the Barangay Ginebra San Miguel of the PBA
Rustico Torrecampo – retired professional boxer, notable for being the first fighter to defeat Manny Pacquiao

Media
Aljo Bendijo – broadcast journalist in the Philippines; anchored ABS-CBN's flagship newscast TV Patrol from 2001 to 2003, and Batingaw (later becoming Teledyaryo: Final Edition) of People's Television Network from 2008 to 2012
Desidario Camangyan – radio journalist for Sunrise FM in Mati City in the southern Philippines; slain on stage in Manay, Davao Oriental, Mindanao, while hosting a singing contest
Alex Santos (newscaster) – field reporter, news director and radio commentator for DWIZ, and television host for UNTV and former newscaster and television host for ABS-CBN and DZMM, now on current for PTV-4
Tulfo Brothers
Ben Tulfo – freelance journalist connected with TV5, PTV-4 and UNTV
Erwin Tulfo – journalist for TV5 Manila, formerly with ABS-CBN, RPN-9 and Radio Mindanao Network 
Raffy Tulfo- journalist for TV5 Manila, formerly with PTV-4, RPN-9 and Radio Mindanao Network
Ramon Tulfo – radio host for DWIZ, columnist for Philippine Daily Inquirer, formerly with RPN-9 and DZIQ

Fashion, designs and arts
Ang Kiukok – painter; national artist
Yam Laranas – director and cinematographer
Danny Sillada – surrealist painter, poet, philosopher, essayist, musician, performance artist and literary, art and cultural critic; from Mindanao

Pageantry
Lia Andrea Ramos – Binibining Pilipinas Universe 2006 and representative of the Philippines in the Miss Universe 2006 pageant held in Los Angeles, California.
Mary Jean Lastimosa – Miss Universe Philippines 2014 and Top 10 Finalist in the Miss Universe 2014 pageant held in Doral, Florida. A native of Tulunan, North Cotabato, Lastimosa studied and resided in Davao City. She won Mutya ng Dabaw (Miss Davao) and was crowned Reyna ng Aliwan in 2008 representing Davao and the Kadayawan Festival. 
Katarina Rodriguez – Binibining Pilipinas Intercontinental 2017, Miss World Philippines 2018 and First Runner-Up in the Miss Intercontinental 2017 pageant held in Egypt. She competed in Miss World Philippines and won the Miss World Philippines title. She also competed in Miss World 2018 held in Sanya, People’s Republic of China.
Jehza Mae Huelar – Binibining Pilipinas Supranational 2018 and Top 10 Finalist in Miss Supranational 2018, held in Poland.

Religion
Apollo Quiboloy – founder and leader of the Philippines-based Restorationist church, the Kingdom of Jesus Christ, The Name Above Every Name, Inc.
Leo Soriano – Bishop of the United Methodist Church, elected in 2000 in the Philippines

Gallery

References

People from the Davao Region
Davao
Davao